Núria Parlon Gil (born 2 August 1974) is a Spanish politician who belongs to the Socialists' Party of Catalonia. She has served as Mayor of Santa Coloma de Gramenet since 2009.

References

1974 births
Living people
Socialists' Party of Catalonia politicians
20th-century Spanish women politicians
21st-century Spanish women politicians
Women politicians from Catalonia
Members of the Parliament of Catalonia
Women mayors of places in Spain
Municipal councillors in the province of Barcelona
Mayors of places in Catalonia